This is a list of Austria international footballers – football players who have played in one to 24 matches for the Austria national football team.

See also
 List of Austria international footballers, players with 25 caps or more

References

 
Association football player non-biographical articles